Esmaeil Kowsari (born 3 March 1955) is an Iranian military officer and conservative politician who was the deputy chief of Tharallah Headquarters, an Islamic Revolutionary Guard Corps unit responsible for maintaining security in Tehran. Kowsari was a member of the Parliament of Iran from 2008 to 2016, representing Tehran, Rey, Shemiranat and Eslamshahr.

As of 2014, he was the head of the Iranian parliament's committee on defense and national security. He was also a special commission for examining the JCPOA member.

Views 
He is an outspoken critic of President Hassan Rouhani and his administration, as well as the nuclear negotiations leading to the Joint Comprehensive Plan of Action, terming it "wasting time". Kowsari was among Delvāpaṣ attendees of the 2014 landmark anti-nuclear deal conference named "We're Worried", held at the former Embassy of the United States, Tehran.

According to The Wall Street Journal, the music on hold for his office telephone is the famous song with the lyrics “America, death to your deceit! The blood of our youth is dripping from your claw”. He called Javad Zarif's handshake with the U.S. President Barack Obama an "unrevolutionary act" and called for his impeachment in October 2015.

Kowsari has rebuked reformists, stating in 2013 that Iranians "fundamentally no longer trust" the faction.

References 

1955 births
Living people
Deputies of Tehran, Rey, Shemiranat and Eslamshahr
Members of the 8th Islamic Consultative Assembly
Members of the 9th Islamic Consultative Assembly
Front of Islamic Revolution Stability politicians
Islamic Revolutionary Guard Corps brigadier generals
Islamic Revolutionary Guard Corps personnel of the Iran–Iraq War